The 1989 Scott Tournament of Hearts, the Canadian women's national curling championship, was held from February 25 to March 4, 1989 at the Kelowna Memorial Arena in Kelowna, British Columbia. The total attendance for the week was 19,436.

The defending champions, Team Canada, who was skipped by Heather Houston repeated as champions as they defeated Manitoba in the final 11–5. This was the first time since the introduction of Team Canada in  that they had won the event and the first time since  that a team has successfully defended their title.

Houston's rink would again go onto represent Canada at the 1989 World Women's Curling Championship in Milwaukee, Wisconsin, USA where they won the gold medal over Norway after finishing runner-up the year before.

There were a few notable feats and records that were set in this tournament.
 Alberta's 15–6 victory over Newfoundland in Draw 2 set a Hearts era (since ) record for the highest score by a team in one game. This has since been matched three different times.
 Manitoba's 8–0 victory over Alberta in Draw 12 was the fifth time in tournament history that a shutout was recorded.
 The semifinal between Canada and Saskatchewan was the third game ever in tournament history and the only playoff game to date to go into a second extra end.

Teams
The teams were listed as follows:

Round Robin standings
Final Round Robin standings

Round Robin results
All draw times are listed in Pacific Standard Time (UTC-08:00).

Draw 1
Saturday, February 25, 12:00 pm

Draw 2
Saturday, February 25, 6:00 pm

Draw 3
Sunday, February 26, 12:00 pm

Draw 4
Sunday, February 26, 6:00 pm

Draw 5
Monday, February 27, 8:00 am

Draw 6
Monday, February 27, 12:00 pm

Draw 7
Monday, February 27, 6:00 pm

Draw 8
Tuesday, February 28, 8:00 am

Draw 9
Tuesday, February 28, 12:00 pm

Draw 10
Tuesday, February 28, 6:00 pm

Draw 11
Wednesday, March 1, 8:00 am

Draw 12
Wednesday, March 1, 12:00 pm

Draw 13
Wednesday, March 1, 6:00 pm

Draw 14
Thursday, March 2, 12:00 pm

Draw 15
Thursday, March 2, 6:00 pm

Tiebreakers

Round 1
Friday, March 3, 8:00 am

Round 2
Friday, March 3, 12:00 pm

Playoffs

Semifinal
Friday, March 3, 6:00 pm

Final
Saturday, March 4, 11:15 am

Statistics

Top 5 player percentages
Final Round Robin Percentages

Perfect games

Awards
The all-star team and sportsmanship award winners were as follows:

All-Star Team

Sylvia Fedoruk Award 
The Scotties Tournament of Hearts Sportsmanship Award is presented to the curler who best embodies the spirit of curling at the Scotties Tournament of Hearts. The winner was selected in a vote by all players at the tournament. 

Prior to 1998, the award was named after a notable individual in the curling community where the tournament was held that year.

Notes

References

Scotties Tournament of Hearts
Scott Tournament of Hearts
Scott Tournament Of Hearts, 1989
Sport in Kelowna
Curling in British Columbia
1989 in women's curling
February 1989 sports events in North America
March 1989 sports events in Canada